Monewden Meadows is a  biological Site of Special Scientific Interest south-west of Monewden in Suffolk. It is a Nature Conservation Review site, Grade I, and it is managed by the Suffolk Wildlife Trust under the name Martins' Meadows.

The site consists of three unimproved fields described as a "species-rich lowland meadow" classified as type MG5. It is described as the best remaining area of clay or neutral lowland meadow remaining in Suffolk. Floral species include snake's-head fritillary (Fritillaria meleagris), early purple orchid (Orchis mascula), green-winged orchid (Anacamptis morio), pyramidal orchid (Anacamptis pyramidalis), common twayblade (Listera ovata), meadow saffron (Colchicum autumnale), adder's-tongue fern (Ophioglossum vulgatum), pepper saxifrage (Silaum silaus) and rim lichen (Lecanora pulicaris). Notable fauna includes great-crested newt (Triturus cristatus) and barn owl (Tyto alba).

There is access from the road between Monewden and Clopton.

See also
List of Sites of Special Scientific Interest in Suffolk
Suffolk Wildlife Trust

References

Sites of Special Scientific Interest in Suffolk
Suffolk Wildlife Trust